Zhytomyr Oblast Football Federation is a football governing body in the region of Zhytomyr Oblast, Ukraine. The federation is a member of the Football Federation of Ukraine.

Previous Champions

1945    FC Dynamo Zhytomyr (1)
1946    FC Dynamo Zhytomyr (2)
1947    FC Dynamo Zhytomyr (3)
1948    FC Dynamo Zhytomyr (4)
1949    FC Dynamo Zhytomyr (5)
1950    FC Dynamo Zhytomyr (6)
1951    FC Dynamo Zhytomyr (7)
1952    FC Dynamo Zhytomyr (8)
1953    FC Dynamo Zhytomyr (9)
1954    FC Dynamo Zhytomyr (10)
1955    FC Baranivka Porcelain Factory (1)
1956    FC Kolhospnyk Zhytomyr (1)
1957    FC Burevisnyk Novohrad-Volynskyi (1)
1958    FC Avanhard Zhytomyr (1)
1959    FC Shakhtar Korostyshiv (1)
1960    FC Shakhtar Korostyshiv (2)
1961    FC Prohres Berdychiv (1)
1962    FC Prohres Berdychiv (2)
1963    FC Prohres Berdychiv (3)
1964    FC Elektrovymiryuvach Zhytomyr (1)
1965    FC Elektrovymiryuvach Zhytomyr (2)
1966    FC Elektrovymiryuvach Zhytomyr (3)
1967    FC Elektrovymiryuvach Zhytomyr (4)
1968    FC Elektrovymiryuvach Zhytomyr (5)
1969    FC Elektrovymiryuvach Zhytomyr (6)
1970    FC Elektrovymiryuvach Zhytomyr (7)
1971    FC Elektrovymiryuvach Zhytomyr (8)
1972    FC Elektrovymiryuvach Zhytomyr (9)
1973    FC Elektrovymiryuvach Zhytomyr (10)
1974    FC Elektrovymiryuvach Zhytomyr (11)
1975    FC Elektrovymiryuvach Zhytomyr (12)
1976    FC Torpedo Zhytomyr (1)
1977    FC Prohres Berdychiv (4)
1978    FC Elektrovymiryuvach Zhytomyr (13)
1979    FC Shkiryanyk Berdychiv (1)
1980    FC Elektrovymiryuvach Zhytomyr (14)
1981    FC Elektrovymiryuvach Zhytomyr (15)
1982    FC Prohres Berdychiv (5)
1983    FC Torpedo Zhytomyr (2)
1984    FC Prohres Berdychiv (6)
1985    FC Prohres Berdychiv (7)
1986    FC Prohres Berdychiv (8)
1987    FC Prohres Berdychiv (9)
1988    FC Prohres Berdychiv (10)
1989    FC Papirnyk Malyn (1)
1990    FC Keramik Baranivka (2)
1991    FC Papirnyk Malyn (2)
1992    FC Keramik Baranivka (3)
1993    FC Keramik Baranivka (4)
1994    FC Krok Zhytomyr (1)
1995    FC Papirnyk Malyn (3)
1996    FC Budivelnyk Zhytomyr (1)
1997    FC Systema-KKhP Cherniakhiv (1)
1998    FC Systema-KKhP Cherniakhiv (2)
1999    FC Systema-KKhP Cherniakhiv (3)
2000    FC Rud Zhytomyr (1)
2001    FC Rud Zhytomyr (2)
2002    FC Systema-KKhP Cherniakhiv (4)
2003    FC Khimmash Korosten (1)
2004    FC Khimmash Korosten (2)
2005    FC Khimmash Korosten (3)
2006    FC Berdychiv (1)
2007    FC Lehion Zhytomyr (1)
2008    FC Metalurh Malyn (1)
2009    FC Khimmash Korosten (4)
2010    FC Zvyahel-750 Novohrad-Volynskyi (1)
2011 (K) FC Lehion Zhytomyr (2)
2011 (O) FC Barashi (1)
2012    SC Korosten (1)
2013    FC Polissya Horodnytsia (1)
2014    SC Korosten (2)
2015    SC Korosten (3)
2016    SC Korosten (4)
2017    FC Polissya Horodnytsia (2)
2018    FC Polissya Stavky (1)
2019    FC Zvyahel Novohrad-Volynskyi (2)

Top winners
 15 – FC Elektrovymiryuvach Zhytomyr 
 10 – FC Dynamo Zhytomyr 
 10 – FC Prohres Berdychiv 
 4 – 4 clubs (SC Korosten, Khimmash, Systema-KKhP, Keramik)
 3 – FC Papirnyk Malyn
 2 – 5 clubs (Polissya Horodnytsia, Lehion, Rud, Shakhtar, Torpedo, Zvyahel)
 1 – 10 clubs

Professional clubs
 FC Dynamo Zhytomyr, 1946
 FC Polissya Zhytomyr (Avangard, Avtomobilist), 1959-1968

See also
 FFU Council of Regions

References

External links
 Zhytomyr Oblast. Ukrayinskyi Football 

Football in the regions of Ukraine
Football governing bodies in Ukraine
Sport in Zhytomyr Oblast